Raquel Giscafré (born 15 May 1949) is a former professional tennis player from Argentina. She was Argentina's No. 1 female player from 1973 to 1976. She competed in the Fed Cup from 1966 to 1978. She was a tennis promoter and ran the WTA's Acura Classic each year from 1984 until 2007.

References

External links
 
 

1949 births
Living people
Argentine female tennis players
Sportspeople from Santa Fe, Argentina
20th-century Argentine women